Hajra Yamin is a Pakistani actress who has appeared in Urdu television serials. She made her film debut with a supporting role in Maan Jao Na (2018). She later appeared as a leading lady in Pinky Memsaab (2018), which earned her a nomination for Best Actress at Lux Style Awards.

Filmography

Film

Television

Web series

References

External links

21st-century Pakistani actresses
Pakistani television actresses
Living people
Year of birth missing (living people)
Actresses from Karachi